Michael Kenneth Paynter (born 8 December 1948, Cornwall, United Kingdom) is a retired Cornish civil servant, trade union activist, and poet. Apart from a period of study at the University of Newcastle, he has lived in St Ives.

He is a member of Gorsedh Kernow, and was initiated as a bard under the bardic name Skogynn Pryv (Worm's Fool) in 2003 after passing a Cornish language examination after four years of study, largely conducted during train journeys as a trade union representative. The name is derived from the nickname of a smuggler's assistant in a local story who outwitted a Customs man, and was chosen for him as he worked for 32 years in the Inland Revenue. He assumed the position of Deputy Grand Bard in September 2006 and was promoted to Grand Bard in September 2009 until he handed the title over to Maureen Fuller (Steren Mor) at the end of the Camelford Gorsedd on 1 September 2012. He was a member of the Cornish Language Board (Kesva an Taves Kernewek) from 2006 to 2015, the Chairman Bewnans Kernow from 2009 to 2012, and the Treasurer Bewnans Kernow from 2012 to 2016.
He was the 2003 winner of the Poetry Cornwall/Bardhonyeth Kernow poetry competition and was thereafter invited to edit contributions in languages other than English and their translation in PC/BK.
In addition to his contributions to anthologies, he wrote three collections of poetry in Cornish with English translations, and is the Cornish Language Editor of Poetry Cornwall / Bardhonyaeth Kernow. His poetry combines the easy flow of colloquial Cornish with a variety of influences ranging from Afro-American song to Primo Levi and early Celtic literature. He is a frequent contributor to magazines such as Scryfa and Poetry Cornwall / Bardhonyeth Kernow. His collection "A Worm's Folly" was nominated in the 2012 Holyer An Gof literary awards. He was elected President of the St Ives Old Cornwall Society at its 2014 AGM and continued until 2017 where he was succeeded by Margaret Stevens.

Publications
2000: "ReveNews October issue" poem "Dhe Betronella"in article "Phil & Mick fly the flag for the Cornish language" 
2001: Routh a Vaneryow/A Crowd of Banners. Porthia: Pendrivel
2001: Michel Corolleur 1895–1942. Porthia: Pendrivel
2002: Yn ow Hilyarth Nebjydh /In my Backyard Someday. Porthia: Pendrivel
2003: Bardhonyeth Kernow / Poetry Cornwall. 2003–2014 
2003: Scryfa; vol. 2. Callington (poem in anthology)
2004   "An Gannas niv 330" article in Cornish language magazine "Kuntelles Keltek, Istori daswelys" June 2004
2004: And all the World Our Patch:  Cornish language poems and others . Redruth: Palores Publications 
2006: 101 Poets for a Cornish Assembly. Portishead: Boho Press (poems in anthology edited by Les Merton)
2006: Nothing Broken: recent poetry in Cornish. London: Francis Boutle (poems in anthology edited by Tim Saunders)
2007: Scryfa; vol. 7. Callington (poem in anthology)
2007: Kernow Bys Vykken (Cornwall Forever) (a collection set to music)
2009: "Time for Song/Termyn rag Kan" London,(translation of poem in anthology)
2009 "Englands Ende am Keltischen Meer,Cornwall sucht nacht seiner identitat" interview with BR Horfunk's Ralf Borchard                                               
2010Scryfa; vol. 12. Callington (poems in anthology)                                                                                                                                         *2010Scryfa; vol. 12. Callington (poems in anthology)
2010: Gwydh Meur a Gernow / Great Trees of Cornwall. Redruth: Palores (joint editor with Les Merton)
2010 "Cornish Bards of the St.Ives Area/Berdh Kernow an Ranndir Porthia" Gorsedh Kernow Archives& Publications Committee/St Ives Archive Centre(Bilingual foreword)
2011 "A Worm's Folly". London: Francis Boutle (Kernewek Poetry Collection with English translations, foreword by Mererid Hopwood)
2011'Thus Es Et'London; Francis Boutle Essay on the relation of KERNEWEK to Dialect and dialect verses in anthology of Cornish Dialect edited by Les Merton
2011 "Cornish Bards of the Helston/Berdh Kernow an Ranndir Hellys" Gorsedh Kernow Archives& Publications Committee
2012 "Cornish Bards of the North Cornwall Area/Berdh Kernow an Ranndir Kernow Gledh" Gorsedh Kernow Archives& Publications Committee
2013.Film of Poem, translated from Breton of Yann Ber Kalloc'h "My Yw Genys Yn Kres An Mor". Produced By; Alban Roinard; Producer; Joseph Clarke; Directed By; Alban Roinard; Production Partners; Joseph Clarke.Shortlisted for Celtic Media Festival 2014
2014 "Almanac Edition of 2015 Shore Shelter Calendar" Bilingual Poem and ripping yarn in Kernewek . St Ives Shore Shelter
2014 "Wave Hub,New Poetry from Cornwall";London:Francis Boutle. Poems in anthology edited by Dr Alan M Kent  
2015 "Barddas :: Y Gymdeithas Gerdd Dafod Rhifyn 327 :: Eisteddfod 2015" Interview in Welsh language translated from Cornish by editor Twm Morys...
2016 "An Gannas Mis Ebril 2016";Launceston; Kowethas an Yeth Kernewek Translated song in magazine 
2016 "An Gannas Mis Metheven 2016"; Launceston; Kowethas an Yeth Kernewek. Translated poem in magazine.
2018 "The Voices of Cornwall Volume 2/Kernow for Christmas" Vocal track sung on CD "Karol Sen De"
2019"GO CORNISH Interview How to include cornish in your wedding Sept 2019gocornish.org/inspiration/how-to-include-the...
2020"An Gannas Mis Hwevrer niver 518" Short story An Treghblew

References

"ReveNews October issue" article "Phil & Mick fly the flag for the Cornish language" October 2000
"pcs Dyskans Kernow no 1" article "The Interview, Mick Paynter, Union Learning Rep & Bard" July 2005
"'Worm's Fool' to be the next deputy grand bard", Western Morning News, Plymouth, 29 August 2006
"New Grand Bard identifies challenges for the Gorsedd". Western Morning News, Wednesday, 2 September 2009, 11:00
"Our time is coming' says new Grand Bard." West Briton;;l 9 September 2009.
"Grand Bard: Piran Pascoe's column is as false as Jordan's silicone surgery". West Briton, Friday, 18 September 2009
Mick Paynter, Gallery of Grand Bards, Gorseth Kernow
 "A Cornish character: Mick Paynter, Grand Bard" Cornish World Magazine; December 2009
«Gorseth Kernow seen as a "cultural leader"» Cornish Guardian; 9 June 2010.
"Gorsedd seen as cultural leader, says Grand Bard". The Cornishman; 10 June 2010
"Territorial integrity at risk, Grand Bard warns Gorsedd", West Briton, :9 September 2010
"Cornish Reflections: An easier way to learn Kernewek" by Mick Paynter, Cornish Guardian; Truro (UK), 10 March 2010*
"Cornish Reflections: by Grand Bard Mick Paynter" Cornish Guardian; Truro (UK), 31 March 2010
"THERE'S no word for Jumbo?" by Mick Paynter, West Briton; 17 June 2010
"How Cornish lived their lives in paper's early days" by Mick Paynter West Briton; 15 July 2010
"Grand Bard Mick Paynter: Everyone must do what is needed", "New sword and book for Gorsedd" West Briton; 2 September 2010 – article
«"A Paynter for every Cornish time" a rebel poet of many causes. Book Review A WORM'S FOLLY» in Morning Star; 13 July 2011
"Guardians of a rich cultural heritage" Cornish Guardian / Cornishman, Thursday, 18 August 2011
"Lyther a Gembra" "Brav pup-prys yw Skogynn Pryv yn dann gewsel" article in An Gannas; l October 2011    
"The Bards are back" Mensa Magazine; February 2012
"Filiocht i gCoirnis bheo bhriomhar" Colm de Faoite, Review in Carn; February 2012Maga-Lyther Nowodhow; Mis Est 2012, "A Worm's Folly, kuntel bryntin a varthonogow gans Mick Paynter a dhiskwa y gerensa dhown rag Kernow ha lieskonykter an yeth Kernewek"
 Maga Newsletter; August 2012 "A Worm's Folly  a wonderful collection of poems by Mick Paynter"
 Cornishman/West Briton; 7 May 2014 "Darkly does it" "The arresting voice of Mick Paynter" review of showing of "My yw Genys"
 Cornishman; 30 August 2014 "Five week Cornish Course to start in Madron"Western Morning News; 25 September 2014 "Bards embrace Democracy to elect new leader"
"Wedding Fair demonstrates proper Cornish ceremony", Article in St Ives Times & Echo'', 12 June 2015

1948 births
Living people
Bards of Gorsedh Kernow
Cornish-language writers
Cornish-speaking people
Cornish culture
People from St Ives, Cornwall
Poets from Cornwall